Sidi Abdelmoumen is a town and rural commune in Chichaoua Province of the Marrakech-Safi region of Morocco. At the time of the 2014 census, the commune had a total population of 9007 people living in 1908 households, it content  many douars like Tarselt, Ait Smail, Tadnest.

References

Populated places in Chichaoua Province
Rural communes of Marrakesh-Safi